The Watershed Institute, formerly known as the Stony Brook–Millstone Watershed Association, is a New Jersey nonprofit organization devoted to promoting and protecting the watersheds of central New Jersey's Stony Brook and Millstone River, along with associated natural resources and beauty. Claiming to be central New Jersey's first environmental group, it was established in 1949. The organization promotes and advocates conservation and restoration of natural habitats, collects data on environmental conditions in its watersheds, and provides environmental education through numerous programs.

The organization is centered on its 950-acre nature reserve in Hopewell Township, Mercer County, which includes portions of Stony Brook, Wargo pond, over ten miles of trails, the seasonal Kate Gorrie Butterfly House, and the LEED-platinum Watershed Center for Environmental Advocacy, Science, and Education.

The Watershed Institute hiking trails are typically open to the public from dawn to dusk, with exceptions occurring during hunting season and days after severe weather events. The trails include the 2.2 mile Stony Brook trail (on the east side of the preserve), the 6 mile Watershed trail (spanning the whole reserve and going North to South), the 1.6 mile Farm/History trail (on the west side), and the 2.5 mile Meadow/Pond trail (circling Wargo pond).  

The Andrew and Hannah Drake Farmstead, also known as the Brookdale Farm, is a historic site at the reserve. It was the home of Dr. Muriel Gardiner Buttinger, a noted author and psychologist, from 1940 until 1965.

References

Environmental organizations based in New Jersey
Nature reserves in New Jersey
Organizations established in 1949
1949 establishments in New Jersey
Hopewell Township, Mercer County, New Jersey
Water organizations in the United States
Protected areas of Mercer County, New Jersey
Nature centers in New Jersey